"OK" is a song by German DJ and record producer Robin Schulz. The song was released on 19 May 2017 as the second single from his third studio album, Uncovered (2017). It features vocals by English singer-songwriter James Blunt.

Background 
The song was originally written by Blunt for his album The Afterlove but did not make the final cut. Blunt told Sodajerker, a podcast about songwriting, that the record company thought the song was a hit, but that he himself did not think he "nailed it" and refused to release it. Later he met his friend Schulz, who, to Blunt's surprise, had heard the unreleased song and had been "fucking with it". Blunt said that the dj had "added the Robin Schulz magic", and admitted that the record company had been right about the song's potential.

The song was performed by Schulz for an audience of 8,500 fans at the König Pilsener Arena.

Music video 
The official music video of the song was released on 19 May 2017 through Robin Schulz's YouTube account. It was directed by Liza Minou Morberg and is an obvious homage to the film The Eternal Sunshine of the Spotless Mind.

Track listing

Charts

Weekly charts

Year-end charts

Certifications

References

2017 singles
2017 songs
Robin Schulz songs
James Blunt songs
Deep house songs
Electronic songs
Number-one singles in Poland
Songs written by James Blunt
Songs written by Mozella
Songs written by Steve Mac